Çayırlı is a municipality (belde) and seat of Çayırlı District of Erzincan Province in the Eastern Anatolia region of Turkey. It had a population of 4,882 in 2021. It is divided into the neighborhoods of Atatürk, Barbaros and Fatih.

References

External links
District governor's official website 
District municipality's official website 

Populated places in Erzincan Province

Towns in Turkey